Innafushi as a place name may refer to:
 Innafushi (Alif Dhaal Atoll) (Republic of Maldives)
 Innafushi (Baa Atoll) (Republic of Maldives)
 Innafushi (Haa Dhaalu Atoll) (Republic of Maldives)